Zinc cadmium phosphide arsenide (Zn-Cd-P-As) is a quaternary system of group II (IUPAC group 12) and group V (IUPAC group 15) elements. Many of the inorganic compounds in the system are II-V semiconductor materials. The quaternary system of II3V2 compounds, (Zn1−xCdx)3(P1−yAsy)2, has been shown to allow solid solution continuously over the whole compositional range. This material system and its subsets have applications in electronics, optoelectronics, including photovoltaics, and thermoelectrics.

List of all binary compounds 
This system of elements contains numerous binary compounds and their solid solutions.

Stable at atmospheric pressure 
The binary compounds thermodynamically stable at atmospheric pressure are listed in the following table:

Metastable or unstable at atmospheric pressure 
Compounds metastable or unstable at atmospheric pressure are the following:

Quaternary compounds 
The compounds of the form II3V2 have similar crystalline structures and exhibit full solid solution over the whole compositional range. The compounds of the form II-V2 allow only partial solid solution.

Ternary compounds 
The binary compounds in this system form a wide range of solid solutions. This miscibility reflects the close similarity of the structures of the binary phases. The IIV2 compounds exhibit wide solid solution ranges with CdP4 even though the stoichiometry and structures of the components differ.

The optoelectronic and band properties of some ternary compounds have also been studied. For example, the bandgap of Zn3(P1−yAsy)2 solid solutions is direct and tunable from 1.0 eV to 1.5 eV. This solubility enables the fabrication of tunable nanowire photodetectors. The solid solution (Zn1−xCdx)3As2 exhibit a topological phase transition at x ~ 0.62.

Notable binary compounds

Cadmium arsenide (Cd3As2)

Cadmium arsenide is a 3D Dirac semimetal exhibiting the Nernst effect.

Zinc phosphide (Zn3P2)

Zinc phosphide is a semiconductor material with a direct band gap of 1.5 eV used in photovoltaics. It is also used as a rodenticide in the pest control industry.

Zinc arsenide (Zn3As2)

Zinc arsenide is a semiconductor material with a band gap of 1.0 eV.

References

External links

II-V semiconductors
Zinc compounds
Cadmium compounds
Arsenides
Phosphides
II-V compounds